The Ambassador Extraordinary and Plenipotentiary of the Russian Federation to the Islamic Republic of Mauritania is the official representative of the President and the Government of the Russian Federation to the President and the Government of Mauritania.

The ambassador and his staff work at large in the Embassy of Russia in Nouakchott.

History of diplomatic relations

Diplomatic relations between the Soviet Union and Mauritania were established on 12 July 1964.  was appointed ambassador on 8 March 1965. With the dissolution of the Soviet Union in 1991, the government of Mauritania recognized the Russian Federation on 29 December 1991. The Soviet ambassador, continued as representative of the Russian Federation until 1994.

List of representatives (1965 – present)

Representatives of the Soviet Union to Mauritania (1965 – 1991)

Representatives of the Russian Federation to Mauritania (1991 – present)

References 

 
Mauritania
Russia